Bulgaria participated in the Eurovision Song Contest 2021 with the song "Growing Up Is Getting Old" written by Victoria Georgieva, Maya Nalani, Helena Larsson and Oliver Björkvall. The song was performed by Victoria, which is the artistic name of singer Victoria Georgieva. On 21 March 2020, the Bulgarian broadcaster Bulgarian National Television (BNT) announced that Victoria had been selected to compete at the 2021 contest in Rotterdam, Netherlands, after she was due to compete in the 2020 contest with "Tears Getting Sober" before the 2020 event's cancellation. The song that Victoria competed with, "Growing Up Is Getting Old", was also internally selected and was presented to the public during a special concert on 10 March 2021.

Bulgaria was drawn to compete in the second semi-final of the Eurovision Song Contest which took place on 20 May 2021. Performing during the show in position 13, "Growing Up Is Getting Old" was announced among the top 10 entries of the second semi-final and therefore qualified to compete in the final on 22 May. It was later revealed that Bulgaria placed third out of the 17 participating countries in the semi-final with 250 points. In the final, Bulgaria performed in position 17 and placed eleventh out of the 26 participating countries, scoring 170 points.

Background 

The nation achieved their best result in the contest in 2017 with the song "Beautiful Mess" performed by Kristian Kostov, which placed second. To this point, only four Bulgarian entries had managed to have qualified to the Eurovision final; the nation had failed to qualify to the final with their other eight entries. In 2018, Equinox and their song "Bones" qualified to the final and placed fourteenth.

The Bulgarian national broadcaster, Bulgarian National Television (BNT), broadcasts the event within Bulgaria and organises the selection process for the nation's entry. In the past, BNT had alternated between both internal selections and national finals in order to select the Bulgarian entry. In October 2018, the Bulgarian broadcaster announced that the country would not participate in 2019 citing financial difficulties as the reason for their decision. Following their one-year absence, BNT confirmed Bulgaria's participation in the 2021 Eurovision Song Contest on 21 March 2020. For their 2021 entry, the broadcaster internally selected the Bulgarian entry, a selection procedure that was used since 2016.

Before Eurovision

Internal selection 
On 21 March 2020, BNT confirmed that Victoria would remain as Bulgaria's representative for the Eurovision Song Contest 2021. A songwriting camp was held in Burgas and Primorsko between 16 and 26 August 2021 in order to create potential songs for Victoria. On 29 January 2021, the broadcaster announced that Victoria's song would be selected by several focus groups, including music, radio and television industry professionals as well as international Eurovision experts, from six songs. Five of the songs came from her recently released five-song EP A Little Dramatic, while the remaining song was her most recent single "Ugly Cry". On 20 February 2021, an online platform was launched for the public to also evaluate and provide feedback about the six songs until 1 March 2021.

The selected song "Growing Up Is Getting Old" was presented on 7 March 2020 during a special concert broadcast on BNT 1 as well as online via YouTube and the broadcaster's official Eurovision Song Contest website eurovision.icard.com. In addition to the presentation of the song, guest performers were Alex Raeva, Azis, Dara, Grafa, member of 2008 German Eurovision Song Contest entrant No Angels Lucy Diakovska, Mihaela Fileva and Venci Venc'. The song was written by Maya Nalani, Helena Larsson, Oliver Björkvall as well as Victoria herself, and was selected by BNT from two shortlisted songs: "Growing Up Is Getting Old" and "Imaginary Friend".

At Eurovision 

According to Eurovision rules, all nations with the exceptions of the host country and the "Big Five" (France, Germany, Italy, Spain and the United Kingdom) are required to qualify from one of two semi-finals in order to compete for the final; the top ten countries from each semi-final progress to the final. The European Broadcasting Union (EBU) split up the competing countries into six different pots based on voting patterns from previous contests, with countries with favourable voting histories put into the same pot. The semi-final allocation draw held for the Eurovision Song Contest 2020 on 28 January 2020 was used for the 2021 contest, which Bulgaria was placed into the second semi-final, to be held on 20 May 2021, and was scheduled to perform in the second half of the show.

Once all the competing songs for the 2021 contest had been released, the running order for the semi-finals was decided by the shows' producers rather than through another draw, so that similar songs were not placed next to each other. Bulgaria was set to perform in position 13, following the entry from Portugal and before the entry from Finland.

The two semi-finals and the final were broadcast in Bulgaria on BNT 1 and BNT 4 with commentary by Elena Rosberg and Georgi Kushvaliev. The Bulgarian spokesperson, who announced the top 12-point score awarded by the Bulgarian jury during the final, was Joanna Dragneva who represented Bulgaria at the 2008 contest as the lead singer of Deep Zone.

Semi-final 

Victoria took part in technical rehearsals on 11 and 14 May, followed by dress rehearsals on 19 and 20 May. This included the jury show on 19 May where the professional juries of each country watched and voted on the competing entries.

The Bulgarian performance featured Victoria performing on a rotating platform in a blue jacket and pants. The LED stage floor displayed water and Victoria stroked a picture of her and her father from her childhood during the song. The performance also featured smoke and an hourglass effect, which a stream of sand was poured in onto the stage with Victoria reaching and touching it. The stage concept of the Bulgarian performance was developed by Austrian director Marvin Dietmann. An off-stage backing vocalist also joined Victoria: the co-composer of "Growing Up Is Getting Old" Maya Nalani.

At the end of the show, Bulgaria was announced as having finished in the top 10 and subsequently qualifying for the grand final. It was later revealed that Bulgaria placed third in the semi-final, receiving a total of 177 points: 101 points from the televoting and 149 points from the juries.

Final 
Shortly after the second semi-final, a winners' press conference was held for the ten qualifying countries. As part of this press conference, the qualifying artists took part in a draw to determine which half of the grand final they would subsequently participate in. This draw was done in the order the countries were announced during the semi-final. Switzerland was drawn to compete in the first half. Following this draw, the shows' producers decided upon the running order of the final, as they had done for the semi-finals. Switzerland was subsequently placed to perform in position 17, following the entry from Finland and before the entry from Lithuania.

Victoria once again took part in dress rehearsals on 21 and 22 May before the final, including the jury final where the professional juries cast their final votes before the live show. Victoria performed a repeat of her semi-final performance during the final on 22 May. Bulgaria placed eleventh in the final, scoring 170 points: 30 points from the televoting and 140 points from the juries.

Voting 
Voting during the three shows involved each country awarding two sets of points from 1-8, 10 and 12: one from their professional jury and the other from televoting. Each nation's jury consisted of five music industry professionals who are citizens of the country they represent, with a diversity in gender and age represented. The judges assess each entry based on the performances during the second Dress Rehearsal of each show, which takes place the night before each live show, against a set of criteria including: vocal capacity; the stage performance; the song's composition and originality; and the overall impression by the act. Jury members may only take part in panel once every three years, and are obliged to confirm that they are not connected to any of the participating acts in a way that would impact their ability to vote impartially. Jury members should also vote independently, with no discussion of their vote permitted with other jury members. The exact composition of the professional jury, and the results of each country's jury and televoting were released after the grand final; the individual results from each jury member were also released in an anonymised form.

Below is a breakdown of points awarded to Bulgaria and awarded by Bulgaria in the second semi-final and grand final of the contest, and the breakdown of the jury voting and televoting conducted during the two shows:

Points awarded to Bulgaria

Points awarded by Bulgaria

Detailed voting results 
The following members comprised the Bulgarian jury:
  (jury member in semi-final 2)
 Katya Mihaylova
 Milka Koleva Miteva (jury member in the final)
 Krassimir Nikolov Gyulmezov
 Suti
 Christina Yankova Mateeva

References

External links

2021
Countries in the Eurovision Song Contest 2021
Eurovision